The women's team pursuit speed skating at the 2011 Asian Winter Games was held on February 6, 2011. 4 nations participated. The race started at 12:05.

Schedule
All times are Almaty Time (UTC+06:00)

Records

Results

References

Women Pursuit